Michaelophorus nubilus, the cacao plume moth, is a species of moth in the genus Michaelophorus known from Venezuela, Peru, Ecuador, Brazil, Colombia, Honduras, Costa Rica, and Trinidad.

References

Platyptiliini
Moths described in 1875
Moths of South America
Taxa named by Alois Friedrich Rogenhofer